Bangladesh is the eighth-most populated country in the world with almost 2.2% of the world's population. As per the 2022 Census of Bangladesh, the country's population is 169,356,251.

Bangladesh (previously East Pakistan between 1947 and 1971 and East Bengal before 1947) is largely ethnically homogeneous, and its name derives from the Bengali ethno-linguistic group which comprises 99% of the population. The Chittagong Hill Tracts, Sylhet, Mymensingh, Barisal and North Bengal regions are home to diverse tribal peoples. There are many dialects of Bengali spoken throughout the region. The dialect spoken by those in Chittagong and Sylhet are particularly distinctive. About (91.04%) of Bangladeshis are Muslims, followed by Hindus (largest-minority) at (7.95%), Buddhists (0.61%) and Christians (0.30%) and others (0.12%) as per 2022 census.

Bangladesh has one of the highest population densities in the world. The total fertility rate (TFR) has been reduced by more than two thirds since Independence. The current TFR in Bangladesh is 2.0, globally considered to be a benchmark for replacement level fertility.

At this TFR, and without migration, Bangladesh's population is expected to soon reach a stage where it neither grows nor shrinks, once the top of its age pyramid fills in.

Population 
The 2020 total population was 168,827,626 which makes Bangladesh the eighth-most populous country in the world.

Census 

The latest decennial census was conducted by the Bangladesh Bureau of Statistics in 2022.

UN estimates

Population by sex and age group 

Population by sex and age group  (Census 15.III.2011):

Population Estimates by sex and age group (01.VII.2020):

Other sources

The following table lists various recent estimates of the population.

According to the OECD/World Bank population in Bangladesh increased from 1990 to 2008 with 44 million and 38% growth in population compared to 34% growth in India and 54% growth in Pakistan. The annual population growth 2007–2008 was 1.4% compared to India 1.35%, Pakistan 2.2%, Dem. Rep. of Congo 2.9%, Tanzania 2.9%, Syria 3.5% or Yemen 4.0%. According to the OECD/World Bank population statistics between 1990 and 2008 the world population growth was 27% and 1,423 million persons.

Population growth rate

Bangladesh had high rates of population growth in the 1960s and 1970s. Since then however it has seen significant reduction in its total fertility rate. Over a period of three decades it dropped from almost 7 to 0.74 in 2005–2018.

Gender ratio

Urban and rural
The sprawling mega-city of Dhaka has a huge population, but the majority of the people nonetheless still live in villages in rural areas.
Urban population: 37.4% of total population (2019 est.)
Rate of urbanization: 3.13% annual rate of change (2019 est.)
Bangladesh is considered an urban country based on their population density

Population density
Based on United Nations Data 2020 figures for population (164,689,383) and land area (130,170 km2), Bangladesh has the highest population density among large countries, 1265 persons per square kilometer, and 10th overall, when small countries and city-states are included.

Vital statistics

Births and deaths 
Notable events in Bangladesh demography:
 1971 Bangladesh genocide

The Population Department of the United Nations prepared the following estimates. Population estimates account for under numeration in population censuses.

Sample vital registration system

Total fertility rate by divisions in 2020

Fertility rate (demographic and health surveys)
Crude birth rate (CBR), total fertility rate (TFR) and wanted fertility rate (WFR):

Health

Life expectancy at birth

Total population: 72.7 years (2018)
Male:  71.1 years
Female: 74.4 years

Source: UN World Population Prospects

HIV/AIDS
Prevalence rate: less than 0.1% (adults, 102nd in world, 2001 est.); 0.01% (2014 est.)
People living with HIV/AIDS: 12,000 (85th in world, 2007 est.)
Deaths: fewer than 500 (87th in world, 2007 est.); about 700 (2014 est.).

Major infectious diseases
Degree of risk: high
Food or waterborne diseases: bacterial and protozoal diarrhea, hepatitis A and E, and typhoid fever
Vector-borne diseases: dengue fever and malaria are high risks in some locations
Water contact disease: leptospirosis
Animal contact disease: rabies (2005)

Ethnic group
The vast majority (about 98%) of Bangladeshis are of the Bengali ethno-linguistic group. This group also spans the neighboring Indian province of West Bengal. Minority ethnic groups include Meitei, Tripuri, Marma, Tanchangya, Barua, Khasi, Santhals, Chakma, Rakhine people, Garo, Biharis, Oraons, Mundas.

Biharis are Urdu-speaking, non-Bengalis who emigrated from the state of Bihar and other parts of northern India during the 1947 partition.  They are concentrated in the Dhaka and Rangpur areas and number some 300,000. In the 1971 independence war many of them sided with Pakistan, as they stood to lose their positions in the upper levels of society.  Hundreds of thousands went to Pakistan and those that remained were interned in refugee camps. Their population declined from about 1 million in 1971 to 600,000 in the late 1980s. Refugees International has called them a "neglected and stateless" people as they are denied citizenship by the governments of Bangladesh and Pakistan. As nearly 40 years has passed, two generations of Biharis have been born in these camps. Biharis were granted Bangladeshi citizenship and voting rights in 2008.

Bangladesh's tribal population was enumerated at 897,828 in the 1981 census. These tribes are concentrated in the Chittagong Hill Tracts and around Mymensingh, Sylhet, and Rajshahi. They are of Sino-Tibetan descent and differ markedly in their social customs, religion, language and level of development. They speak Tibeto-Burman languages and most are Buddhist or Hindu. The four largest tribes are Chakmas, Marmas, Tipperas, Tanchangya,  and Mros. Smaller groups include the Santals in Rajshahi and Dinajpur, and Khasis, Garos, and Khajons in Mymensingh and Sylhet regions.

There are small communities of Meitei people in the Sylhet district, which is close to the Meitei homeland across the border in Manipur, India.

There is a large population of Rohingya refugees from Myanmar near the border in the southeast. There are 28,000 living in two UN refugee camps in Cox's Bazar as well as some 200,000 "unregistered people of concern" living outside of the camps. The refugee crisis originated in the early 1990s when the first wave numbering some 250,000 of the predominantly Muslim ethnic group fled persecution from their home in Rakhaine—Myanmar's westernmost state. Bangladesh seeks to repatriate the refugees back to Myanmar. Since 2017, there are approximately 1.1 million Rohingya refugees living in Bangladesh.

Languages

 Official language: Bengali (also known as Bangla)
 Other languages that are variously considered as the dialects of Bengali: Chittagonian, Sylheti, and Rajbongshi. 
 Bengali–Meitei creole language: Bishnupriya Manipuri 
 Other Indic languages: Assamese, Rohingya, Chakma,Tanchangya and various Bihari languages
 Tibeto-Burman languages: A'Tong, Chak, Koch, Garo, Megam, Tripuri, Meitei language (Manipuri language), Mizo, Mru, Pangkhua, Rakhine/Marma, various Chin languages
 Austroasiatic languages: Khasi, Koda, Mundari, Pnar, Santali, War
 Dravidian languages: Kurukh
 Other languages: English (spoken and known widely in upper-class & politics), Arabic (sometimes spoken and known by many Muslims, due to Islam being the primary religion), Hindi/Urdu (understood by some, and spoken by Biharis)

Bangladesh has 44 indigenous languages according to Professor Shameem Reza.

Religion

Population trends for major religious groups in Bangladesh (1951–2022)

Bangladesh has a population of 165,158,616 as per 2022 census.

Genetics
Bangladesh has the world's highest frequency of the M form of mitochondrial DNA. This genetic variant spans many continents, and is the single most common mtDNA haplogroup in Asia. In Bangladesh it represents about 83% of maternal lineages.

Education 

Bangladesh has a literacy rate of 74.70 percent as of 2019. 76.67 percent for males and 71.95 percent for females.

Migrants 

According to the United Nations, there were 1,500,921 international migrants in Bangladesh in 2017. Estimation shows that over 1 million Rohingya Muslim refugees live in Bangladesh have arrived during the ongoing Rohingya genocide in Myanmar. On 28 September 2018, at the 73rd United Nations General Assembly, Bangladeshi Prime Minister Sheikh Hasina said there are 1.1-1.3 million Rohingya refugees now in Bangladesh.

Their most common countries of origin were as follows:

The United Nations has estimated the Bangladesh diaspora as 4,499,919 people with the greatest migration to the following countries:

See also
 Bangladeshi society
 School of Human Genetic and Population Health

References

External links
  This is also viewable at